The 1981–82 NBA season was the Warriors' 36th season in the NBA and 19th in the San Francisco Bay Area.

Draft picks

Roster

Regular season

Season standings

z - clinched division title
y - clinched division title
x - clinched playoff spot

Record vs. opponents

Game log

Player statistics

Season

Awards and records
 Bernard King, All-NBA Second Team

Transactions

See also
 1981-82 NBA season

References

Golden State Warriors seasons
G
Golden
Golden